Marshall House, also known as McNeil House, is a historic home located at New Cumberland, Hancock County, West Virginia. It was built in 1887 and is a -story, Queen Anne style brick dwelling.  It was built by West Virginia State Senator Oliver S. Marshall (1850-1934) and remained his home until his death.

It was listed on the National Register of Historic Places in 2001.

The house is operated as the Hancock County Museum.

The Marshall House is an elegant 19th century two and one half story Queen Anne style

residence built in 1887 located on Ridge Avenue in New Cumberland, West Virginia

overlooking the Ohio River. The house was built in 1887 by lawyer and West Virginia State

Senator, Oliver Marshall. The Marshall House has remained in the Marshall family

since its construction. The house was built in 1887 by Oliver Marshall.

Exterior

The two and one half story, three bay brick residence has an asphalt roof and stone foundation.

All windows are double-sash with limestone sills and lintels. Windows have interior wood

shutters. Front gable roof end to right has three Queen Anne windows, decorative wood blocks

in peak and a stringcourse under the eaves. There are double brackets at the comers. Gable has

diamond lights. Brick sidewalk has the word "ETNA" imprinted in bricks.

West (Front) Facade

The front facade has 3 bays. There is a full porch with wood posts with spools and pierced wood

block effect brackets. The porch has a shed roof with a left side pedimented gable with a fan

effect oversteps. The double front door has a transom with narrow Queen Anne window with

colored lights in upper sash. The doors are heavily carved and there is the initial " M carved on

the bottom of each door. The interior single door has a cut glass zinc camed window. There are

paired windows to the right and above on second floor, with a single window on left.

South Facade

The south facade has four bays. There is an integral brick chimney with decorative brickwork.

The southeast comer has a wooden porch with turned wood columns and decorative woodwork

around the shed roof. The middle of the facade has a shallow, L-shaped section with a front

gable roof that has decorative wood blocks in the peak and a first floor, hipped roof, bay window.

The hipped roof on this elevation has original slate.

East Facade

The east facade has two bays and an integral, decorative brick chimney. The ease facade shares

the southeast comer porch with south facade

North Facade

The north facade has four bays and an L-shaped middle section with a fiont gable roof. The peak

of the roof has three one over one double-hung sash windows and decorative block woodwork.

The first floor has small colored glass window on northwest side.

Interior - First Floor

The first floor has ornately carved, cherry, woodwork throughout. The entrance hall has an

interior, beveled glass door. There is a wooden, carved staircase leading to the second floor. In

addition, there is a second stairway in the kitchen. In the dining room there is a built in wood

cabinet in the closet and an alcove with carved wood trim. Wood pocket doors kame the

entrance to the living room. The living room, dining room, and library also contain omately

carved mantels surrounding the fireplace in each room. These rooms also have interior wood

shutters.

Interior - Second Floor

The second floor contains five bedrooms and one bathroom. All rooms on this floor have

wooden doors and transoms. The floors are hardwood. Over two of the bedroom doors the

names of Oliver Marshall's children by his first wife, John and Olive, were etched into the

transoms. There is a staircase leading to the finished attic.

Interior - Attic

The attic is finished and has hardwood floors. The attic was used mainly as a playroom for

Oliver Marshall's children.

Exterior – Garage/Storage Shed

One bay, wood, garage storage shed with front gable roof. c. 1955. Noncontributing.

The Marshall House on historic Ridge Avenue was built by West Virginia State Senator Oliver

Marshall in 1887. It qualifies under Criterion B because of Marshall's role in government and

the political history of West Virginia. The Marshall House also qualifies under Criterion C as an

example of late 1 9'h Century Queen Anne architecture. The house has been owned by members

of the Marshall family since its construction. The period of significance is 1887-1934 when it

was the home of Senator Oliver Marshall.

Historical Significance

The Marshall House was built by West Virginia State Senator Oliver Marshall, a descendant of

one of Hancock County's leading families. Oliver Marshall was born in Fairview, now New

Manchester, on September 24, 1850. He was the great-grandson of the pioneer Aaron Marshall,

who came from east of the mountains, from somewhere in Virginia. He is thought to have been a

soldier for Braddock and Washington in the famous campaign of 1755. About 1760 he came to

what is now Hancock County, WV. His land was part of the Johnson Survey, granted in 1775,

when Patrick Henry was governor of Virginia. The grant was for 7,000 acres, but when it was

surveyed it measured 8,100 acres. Of this Aaron Marshall was assigned 205 acres at ten shillings

an acre, payable in whiskey at five shillings a gallon, flour and other forms of currency of the

day. Aaron Marshall had the fourth house on the tract. The original record of title is at

Louisville, Kentucky. The town of Newel1 stands on part of the original grant. In his minutes

George Washington mentions the waterfalls where his tract borders the Ohio River, but the land

of Aaron Marshall was some five miles northeast from that stream.

Aaron Marshall continued to live on his Hancock County land until his death 1826. He was a

Baptist and frequently preached in the Kings Creek area, where he is buried.

Aaron Marshall's son, John, was born in 1782 and died in 1859, spending his entire life in

Hancock County. He was a member of the Presbyterian Church.

John Marshall's son, James G. Marshall, was born at old Fairview, Hancock County on

November 2 1, 1826 and died October 6, 1902. He left the farm, did considerable surveying,

became an attorney, and for twenty-four years was the prosecuting attorney of Hancock County.

He was buried in the old Presbyterian churchyard at Fairview. His wife was Lavina Miller,

daughter of John Miller and granddaughter of David Miller. David Miller settled on Tomlison

Run, where he owned 400 acres, secured from Dorsey Pentecost, one of the two last judges who

held court at Pittsburgh under the authority of the British crown. David had the first house in

Gas Valley, and died in 1835, in his ninety-ninth year. His son, John, spent his life as a farmer at

the old place, and his daughter, Lavina was born there. She died when about sixty years old.

Her three children are: Oliver S., E.D. Marshall, an attorney at Santa Clara, CA, and Ila, who

mamed Dr. J.W. Walton.

Oliver S. Marshall attended West Liberty Normal School and graduated from Bethany College in

1878. Marshall served as a trustee of that college for many years. From 1880 to 1885 Marshall

was principal of the New Cumberland Grade School. In 1884 he was elected the Clerk of the

County Court of Hancock County. He held this office until 1896 when he was elected to the

West Virginia State Senate from the First Senatorial District. That same year he was admitted to

the Hancock County bar. In 1892 Marshall served as a delegate to the Republican National

Convention. Marshall served as President of the State Senate for the 1899 session.

During his term as President of the West Virginia Senate, Marshall presided over Senate

proceedings that led to the passage of a variety of bills. Some of the issues that were decided by

the Senate and the Legislature during Marshall's term as president were incorporation of West

Virginia banks and savings institutions, establishing a procedure for West Virginia public

institutions to report to the Legislature, and reorganizing the process for the Legislature to

consider appropriations bills.

Oliver S. Marshall married Elizabeth Tarr on September 8, 1880. Elizabeth was the daughter of Campbell and Nancy Harnmond Tarr. Campbell Tarr was one of the members of the Richmond

Convention who withdrew when Virginia passed the ordinance of secession. Subsequently, Tarr became a leader in the West Virginia statehood movement.

In 1887, Oliver Marshall hired an architect named Smith to build a house on Ridge Avenue

according to Marshall's specifications. The Queen Anne style home was constructed with bricks

made in New Cumberland from local clay. The Marshall house is the finest example of

Queen Anne style architecture in New Cumberland.

Oliver and Elizabeth Marshall had two children, John and Olive. John graduated from Yale and

West Virginia University and later practiced law in Parkersburg. After the death of Elizabeth,

Marshall married Nora Householder in 1890. The Marshalls had three children: Edith, Edmond,

and Virginia. Oliver Marshall died in 1934 at the age of 66. After his death, Marshall's

daughter, Virginia Marshall, lived in the house and taught school in New Cumberland for forty

years. She resided in the Marshall house until her death in 1997.

Summary

The Marshall/McNeil House is significant under Criterion B because it was the home of one of

New Cumberland's leading politicians, Oliver Marshall. During his lifetime, Marshall served

Hancock County as a teacher, lawyer, West Virginia State Senator, and President of the West

Virginia Senate. The house was Oliver Marshall's home from the time is was built in 1887 till

his death in 1934. The Marshall/McNeil House also qualifies under Criterion C as an excellent

example of late 19th century Queen Anne architecture

Bibliography

Bicentennial Committee. A short History of New Cumberland (Hancock Courier Printing

Company, 1939)

Hancock County Deed Books and Maps. Hancock County Courthouse. New Cumberland, West

Virginia.

Sanborn Fire Insurance Maps, (New York, Sanborn-Perris Map Co., Limited) 1890, 1897,

1901, 1910, and 1921.

Newton, J. H. History of The Pan-Handle: Being Historical Collections of the Counties of Ohio,

Brooke. Marshall and Hancock, West Virginia. Compiled and written by J. H. Newton,

G. G. Nichols, and A. G. Sprankle. Edited by J. H. Newton. Publisher: Wheeling, W.Va.,

J.A. Caldwell, 1879

History of the Upper Ohio Valley, with family history and biographical sketches: a statement of

its resources, industrial growth and commercial advantages. Madison, Wis.: Brant &

Fuller, 1890.

References

External links
 Hancock County Museum - official site

Houses on the National Register of Historic Places in West Virginia
Queen Anne architecture in West Virginia
Houses completed in 1887
Houses in Hancock County, West Virginia
National Register of Historic Places in Hancock County, West Virginia
Museums in Hancock County, West Virginia
Historic house museums in West Virginia
1887 establishments in West Virginia